Torino Rebaudengo Fossata railway station serves the town and comune of Torino, in the Piedmont region, northwestern Italy. The station is located at the intersection among Corso Venezia, Via Fossata and Via Lauro Rossi.

Services

References

Railway stations in Turin
Railway stations opened in 2009